Mramor, kamen i željezo (trans. Marble, Stone and Iron) is the third live album by Yugoslav rock band Bijelo Dugme, released in 1987. Released as a double album, the material was recorded throughout 1987 during the band's tour in support of their Pljuni i zapjevaj moja Jugoslavijo album.

Mramor, kamen i željezo was the band's last album to feature keyboardist Vlado Pravdić, who unofficially left the band after the album release.

Background
The album was recorded during 1987, on the tour on which the band promoted their 1986 album Pljuni i zapjevaj moja Jugoslavijo. The album offered a retrospective of the band's work, featuring songs from their early singles to their latest album. The title track is a cover of a hit by the Yugoslav beat band .

The album featured similar Yugoslavist iconography as the bands' previous two releases, Bijelo Dugme and Pljuni i zapjevaj moja Jugoslavijo: the track "A milicija trenira strogoću" begins with "The Internationale" melody, during the intro to "Svi marš na ples" the singer Alen Islamović shouts "Bratsvo! Jedinstvo!" ("Brotherhood! Unity!"), and the album cover features a photograph from the 5th Congress of the Communist Party of Yugoslavia.

Mramor, kamen i željezo was the band's last album to feature keyboardist Vlado Pravdić. He left the band after the album release, dedicating himself to computer business. However, he continued to occasionally perform with the band, on larger concerts, and was, until the end of the band's activity, still considered an official member.

Track listing

Reception
Despite the fact that the concerts on the tour were praised, the album was disliked by the critics. Most of them considered Mramor, kamen i željezo the band's worst live album. The band's leader, Goran Bregović stated about the album: "My intention wasn't to make a live album. I just wanted to record some of Bijelo Dugme arrangements."

Personnel
Alen Islamović - vocals
Goran Bregović - guitar, producer
Zoran Redžić - bass guitar, producer
Ipe Ivandić - drums
Vlado Pravdić - keyboard
Laza Ristovski - keyboard

Additional personnel
Amila Sulejmanović - backing vocals
Lidija - backing vocals
Zumreta Midžić - backing vocals
Božidar Lukić - engineer
Braco Radović - engineer
Rajko Bartula-Doktor - engineer (studio)
Goranka Matić - photography
Ivo Pukanić - photography
Kemal Hadžić - photography

References

Mramor, kamen i željezo at Discogs

External links
Mramor, kamen i željezo at Discogs

Bijelo Dugme live albums
1987 live albums
Diskoton albums